Transit Ridge is a ridge, 4 nautical miles (7 km) long, extending east from Royal Society Range between Spring Glacier and Mitchell Glacier, in Victoria Land. The name is one of a group in the area associated with surveying applied in 1993 by New Zealand Geographic Board (NZGB). Named from transit theodolite, a telescope that can be rotated through the vertical position.

Ridges of Victoria Land
Scott Coast